Pallavi Gowda is an Indian television and Film actress, who mainly works in Malayalam, Kannada and Telugu Soaps. She is known for her portrayal of roles in Pasupu Kumkuma, Savitri, Alliyambal and Daya.

Filmography

Television

Films

Web series

See also 

 List of Indian television actresses
 List of Kannada Film actresses

References

External links 

Living people
Year of birth missing (living people)
Indian television actresses
Indian film actresses
Kannada actresses
Actresses in Kannada cinema
21st-century Indian actresses
Actresses in Kannada television
Actresses in Telugu television
Actresses in Malayalam television